Amart Sports (formerly Amart All Sports) was an Australian sports equipment and related apparel chain and was part of the Super Retail Group.

History 
Amart All Sports was founded in 1976 with the first store located in Underwood, Queensland. Since then Amart All Sports expanded throughout Australia to over 60 stores, mainly in homemaker destination centres across Queensland, Victoria, South Australia, New South Wales and Western Australia.

Super Retail Group, who also operates Rebel, acquired the Amart All Sports business in November 2011. In 2012, the chain was rebranded as Amart Sports.

On 24 July 2017, Super Retail Group made the announcement that all Amart Sports stores will be rebranded to Rebel stores by 31 October 2017, expanding the Rebel brand's national footprint to almost 160 stores in Australia. The Amart Sports brand was officially discontinued as of 1 November 2017.

References 

Sporting goods retailers of Australia
Retail companies established in 1976
1976 establishments in Australia
Sporting goods manufacturers of Australia
Multinational companies headquartered in Australia
Super Retail Group
Retail companies disestablished in 2017
2017 disestablishments in Australia
Defunct retail companies of Australia